Louis Xavier François Prével (29 January 1879 – 26 November 1964) was a French single scull rower who competed at the 1900 Summer Olympics. A French and European champion, he won his semifinal, but failed to finish the final. He claimed that another rower knocked him out of his scull.

References

External links

1879 births
1964 deaths
French male rowers
Olympic rowers of France
Rowers at the 1900 Summer Olympics
European Rowing Championships medalists
Sportspeople from Nice